Quechajaja (possibly from Quechua kicha open, qaqa rock, "open rock") is mountain in the northern extensions of the Vilcanota mountain range in the Andes of Peru, about  high. It is located in the Cusco Region, Quispicanchi Province,  Ocongate District. Quechajaja lies south of Anta Punco and Jarjapata, southwest of Chuñuna and east of Vilacirca. It stretches along the Pampahuasi valley whose intermittent stream flows to Tinquimayo in the southwest. At the southern slope of Quechajaja there is a lake named Ampatune (possibly from Aymara for "the one with frogs").

References 

Mountains of Cusco Region
Mountains of Peru